Lamers is a Dutch / Low Franconian patronymic surname, from the now rare given name Lamert, a local form of Lambert. Among variant spellings are Laamers and Laemers. People with the surname include:

 (1834–1903), Dutch theologian
Ine Lamers (born 1954), Dutch photographer and video installation artist
Karl A. Lamers (born 1951), German CDU politician, NATO Parliamentary Assembly president 2010–12
 (1935–2022), German CDU politician
 (born 1964), Dutch painter and photographer
Loiza Lamers (born 1995), Dutch model
Martin Laamers (born 1967), Dutch football midfielder
Rolf Lamers (1927–2016), German middle-distance runner

See also
Lamer (surname)
Lamer, internet pejorative 
Lammers, surname of a similar origin

References

Dutch-language surnames
Patronymic surnames